This is a list of Wikipedia articles about specific twelve-step recovery programs and fellowships. These programs, and the groups of people who follow them, are based on the set of guiding principles for recovery from addictive, compulsive, or other behavioral problems originally developed by Alcoholics Anonymous. The twelve-step method has been adapted widely by fellowships of people recovering from various addictions, compulsive behaviors, and mental health problems. Additionally, some programs have adapted the twelve-step approach in part.

Programs patterned after Alcoholics Anonymous

Fellowships in this section follow reasonably close variations of the Twelve Steps and Twelve Traditions of Alcoholics Anonymous.

AA – Alcoholics Anonymous
ACA – Adult Children of Alcoholics, for those who were raised in alcoholic and other dysfunctional families
Al-Anon/Alateen, for friends and families of alcoholics, associated with AA
CA – Cocaine Anonymous
CLA – Clutterers Anonymous
CMA – Crystal Meth Anonymous 
Co-Anon, for friends and family of cocaine addicts, associated with Cocaine Anonymous
CoDA – Co-Dependents Anonymous, for people working to end patterns of dysfunctional relationships and develop functional and healthy relationships
COSLAA – CoSex and Love Addicts Anonymous, for friends and family of people with a sex or love addiction, associated with SLAA
DA – Debtors Anonymous
EA – Emotions Anonymous, for recovery from mental and emotional illness
FA – Families Anonymous, for relatives and friends of addicts
FA – Food Addicts in Recovery Anonymous
FAA – Food Addicts Anonymous
GA – Gamblers Anonymous
Gam-Anon/Gam-A-Teen, for friends and family members of problem gamblers
HA – Heroin Anonymous
LAA – Love Addicts Anonymous
MA – Marijuana Anonymous
NA – Narcotics Anonymous
N/A – Neurotics Anonymous, for recovery from mental and emotional illness
Nar-Anon, for friends and family members of addicts
NicA – Nicotine Anonymous
OA – Overeaters Anonymous
PA – Pills Anonymous, for recovery from prescription pill addiction
RA – Racists Anonymous
SA – Sexaholics Anonymous
SAA – Sex Addicts Anonymous
SCA – Sexual Compulsives Anonymous
SIA – Survivors of Incest Anonymous
SLAA – Sex and Love Addicts Anonymous
SRA – Sexual Recovery Anonymous
UA – Underearners Anonymous
WA – Workaholics Anonymous

Programs partially patterned after Alcoholics Anonymous

Fellowships in this section use material from Alcoholics Anonymous, and credit its influence but do not necessarily follow both the Twelve Steps and Twelve Traditions of AA.

Celebrate Recovery, Christian-focused twelve-step program for recovery from various behaviors
Courage International, Catholic ministry which ministers to homosexuals
Family Services Addiction Recovery Program, program affiliated with The Church of Jesus Christ of Latter-day Saints that uses twelve-step principles
GROW, a peer support and mutual aid organization for recovery from, and prevention of, serious mental illness
Homosexuals Anonymous, an organization using 14 steps (five of which are derived from the twelve-steps) as a method of conversion therapy.
Pagans In Recovery (PIR), for neopagans recovering from various compulsive/addictive behaviors 
Parents Anonymous (PA), for parents who have abused children
Recovering from Religion, an international non-profit organization that helps people who have left religion, are in the process of leaving, or are dealing with problems arising out of theistic doubt or non-belief.
Schizophrenics Anonymous (SA), for people who are affected by schizophrenia

See also  
 Drug addiction recovery groups
 Self-help groups for mental health
 Twelve-step program

References

External links 

About 12-step programs on DrugAbuse.gov

Lists of organizations